William Rybolt Bass (August 12, 1874 – October 25, 1951) was an American college football player and coach. He served as the head football coach at Kentucky State College—now known as the University of Kentucky—from 1898 to 1899, compiling a record of 12–2–2. As a college football player, he earned letters at Ohio Wesleyan University in 1895 and at the University of Cincinnati in 1896 and 1897.

Head coaching record

References

External links
 

1874 births
1951 deaths
19th-century players of American football
Cincinnati Bearcats football players
Kentucky Wildcats football coaches
Ohio Wesleyan Battling Bishops football players